The Darbuk–Shyok–DBO Road (DS-DBO Road/DSDBO Road), also called the Sub-Sector North Road, is a strategic all-weather road in eastern Ladakh in India, close to the Line of Actual Control with China. It connects Ladakh's capital city Leh, via the villages of Darbuk and Shyok at southern Shyok River Valley, with the Daulat Beg Oldi (DBO) post near the northern border. The 220-km long section between Shyok and DBO was constructed between 2000 and 2019 by India's Border Roads Organisation (BRO). The DS-DBO Road has reduced the travel time between Leh to DBO from 2 days to 6 hours. In January 2023, BRO announced that it is constructing the DSDBO tunnel on this route.

History 
The Darbuk–Shyok–DBO Road traverses the historic winter route, also called the Zamistānee route, used by the trading caravans between Leh and Yarkand. Whereas the summer route would cross the Ladakh Range through the difficult Sasser Pass to reach the Shyok River valley, the winter route used to go via the banks of the Shyok River when the water flow would be much reduced and the frozen river surface could be crossed on foot as needed.

Proceeding on the right (western) bank of the Shyok River up to Sultan Chhushku, the route crossed the river to the eastern bank, and followed the valley of Murgo Nala to reach the village of Murgo. Here, the summer route also joined the winter route after crossing the Shyok River near Saser Brangsa. From here, the joint route followed Burtsa Nala and Depsang Nala to reach the Depsang Plains and went on to the Karakoram Pass via Daulat Beg Oldi.

Route 
The BRO road begins near the village of Shyok, which is the on the west bank of the Shyok River after its V-shaped bend. Shyok already has roads leading west, to Leh via Darbuk, and south, leading to Pangong Tso.  The BRO road crosses the Shyok river to its right bank and rounds the corner, continuing along its right bank due north (on the west side of the river bed).

After passing the historic campsites of Chhumed, Mundro and Mandaltang, it crosses the river near Sultan Chhushku. A 430-metre-long bridge over the full width of the river bed has been constructed and named the 'Colonel Chewang Rinchen Setu'.

After the Setu, the road goes through the valley of Murgo Nala to reach the village of Murgo, then the valley of Burtsa Nala to reach the camping site of Burtsa, and then Depsang nala to pass by Qizil Langar, close to the Line of Actual Control with China. After Qizil Langar, the road enters the Depsang Plains on a more or less straight route to the Dault Beg Oldi.

Sino-Indian border dispute 

Near Burtsa, where the Depsang nala joins the Burtsa Nala, the Line of Actual Control has been disputed by China and India.

China's 1956 claim line as well as the 1960 claim line leave the entire Burtsa Nala (Tiannan river in Chinese nomenclature) in Indian territory.
However, the People's Liberation Army's papers are said to document a so-called "line of actual control on 7 November 1959" which runs within an earshot of the DS–DBO Road.
Since 2013, they began to assert this line as the operative LAC. The Chinese claim that they reached their line in 1962 and withdrew 20 kilometres as part of ceasefire, but the area was "unjustly occupied by India" in later years.

During the border standoff in 2020, the Chinese forces again stationed themselves near a location called  "Y-junction" or "bottleneck" in the Burtsa Nala valley, and blocked the Indian troops from patrolling to the east of it. China was claiming 250 square kilometres of new territory that India was previously accessing, while also posing  threat to the DS-DBO Road.

Construction: 2000-2019 

The construction was initiated in 2000, with a revised deadline of 2014. However, in 2011, an inquiry by the Chief Technical Examiner found that three-quarters of the road had been laid on the river bed, which is unsuitable for military use. A new Border Roads Task Force from Jammu was then commissioned to realign the constructed road on higher ground and to complete it. The revamped project was scheduled for completion in 2017 but was eventually completed in April 2019. The old alignment was used in the intervening period during the winter months.

Upgrades - DSDBO Tunnel: 2023 - present 

DS-DBO Tunnel (DSDBO Tunnel), is being constructed by the BRO on DS-DBO route. It was announced in January 2023, when it was in the DPR (detailed project report) stage.

See also 
 Line of Actual Control
 India-China Border Roads
 Sino-Indian border dispute

Notes

References

Bibliography

External links 
 Prateek Joshi, India’s Growing Military Footprint in Eastern Ladakh: Facing China, CogitAsia, Center for Strategic & International Studies, 26 July 2016.
 Alice G Wells, Why Ladakh road built last year has been a thorn in China's flesh, Economic Timems Prime, 20 May 2020.
 

Roads in Ladakh
Transport in Leh
Border Roads Organisation roads